Kroonstad Commando was a light infantry regiment of the South African Army. It formed part of the South African Army Infantry Formation as well as the South African Territorial Reserve.

History

Origin

Operations

With the Free State Republic

Anglo Boer War
This Commando was involved in the following:
 The battle of Rietfontein took place on 24 October 1899 between six commandos of the Free State Army commanded by General A Piet Cronje and a British Flying Column dispatched from Ladysmith under the command of Sir George White.

The Free State forces consisted of the following commandos:

 Harrismith Commando,
 Kroonstad Commando,
 Winburg Commando,
 Bethlehem Commando,
 Vrede Commando and 
 Heilbron Commando.

 The battle of Magersfontein took place on 11 December 1899. The Kroonstad Command being split into three on strategic koppies.

With the UDF
By 1902 all Commando remnants were placed under British military control and disarmed.

By 1912, however previous Commando members could join shooting associations.

By 1940, such commandos were under control of the National Reserve of Volunteers.

These commandos were formally reactivated by 1948.

With the SADF
During this era, the unit was mostly used for rural area force protection and stock theft control.

The unit resorted under the command of the SADF's Group 24.

With the SANDF

Disbandment
This unit, along with all other Commando units was disbanded after a decision by South African President Thabo Mbeki to disband all Commando Units. The Commando system was phased out between 2003 and 2008 "because of the role it played in the apartheid era", according to the Minister of Safety and Security Charles Nqakula.

Unit Insignia

Leadership

References

See also 
 South African Commando System

Infantry regiments of South Africa
South African Commando Units
Military units and formations of the Second Boer War